The Collins–Marston House is a historic house located at 4703 Old Shell Road in Mobile, Alabama.

Description and history 
The -story wood-frame structure, on a raised brick foundation, was built in 1832 in the Gulf Coast Cottage style. The 20th century saw additions to the rear that roughly tripled the original size of the house. It was placed on the National Register of Historic Places on October 18, 1984, as a part of the 19th Century Spring Hill Neighborhood Thematic Resource.

References

National Register of Historic Places in Mobile, Alabama
Houses on the National Register of Historic Places in Alabama
Houses in Mobile, Alabama
Houses completed in 1832
Gulf Coast cottage architecture in Alabama